Zuglói Sport Egyesület was a Hungarian football club from Zugló, Budapest.

History
Zuglói Sport Egyesület debuted in the 1938–39 season of the Hungarian League and finished ninth.

Name Changes 
1921–1923: Zuglói Nemzeti Torna Egylet
1923: merger with Zuglói Testvériség Futball Club
1923–1939: Zuglói Sport Egyesület
1939: merger with Danuvia SE 
1939–1952: Zuglói Danuvia SE
1948: merger with XIV. ker. MaDISz 
1952–1953: Vasas Torpedo
1953–1956: Vasas Danuvia
1956–?: Zuglói Danuvia SE
1978: merger with BVG Zuglói SC

References

External links
 Profile

Football clubs in Hungary
1921 establishments in Hungary